Wyry  is a village in Mikołów County, Silesian Voivodeship, in southern Poland. It is the seat of the gmina (administrative district) called Gmina Wyry.

The village has a population of 6,400.

History
The village was first mentioned in a 1287 document of Mieszko I, Duke of Cieszyn, when it was part of Piast-ruled fragmented Poland. Its name comes from an Old Polish word wir, meaning "spring".

During the political upheaval caused by Matthias Corvinus the land around Pszczyna was overtaken by Casimir II, Duke of Cieszyn, who sold it in 1517 to the Hungarian magnates of the Thurzó family, forming the Pless state country. In the accompanying sales document issued on 21 February 1517 the village was mentioned as Wyry. The Kingdom of Bohemia in 1526 became part of the Habsburg monarchy. In the War of the Austrian Succession most of Silesia was conquered by the Kingdom of Prussia, including the village. In 1770 the first coal mine in Wyry was opened. Part of Germany from 1871, the village was reintegrated with Poland, after the country regained independence in 1918 and the majority of the population voted for reintegration with Poland in the Upper Silesia plebiscite in 1921 (1038 votes for Poland, 123 for Germany).

In the first days of the invasion of Poland, which started World War II, in September 1939, Wyry was the site of fierce Polish defense against invading Germany. Afterwards, on 4–6 September 1939, the Germans murdered several Polish inhabitants of the village. There is a memorial to the murdered inhabitants, as well as graves of fallen Polish soldiers of the 1939 battle, in Wyry.

Coal was mined in Wyry until the 1960s.

References

Wyry
Silesian Voivodeship (1920–1939)